Leo Saussay (born 15 January 1990) is a Thai-French actor, TV presenter and singer, who was a member of Thai pop band, B.O.Y.

Early life and education
Saussay was born to a French father and a Thai mother. He graduated from Wat Nairong School and received a bachelor's degree of Arts in French from Ramkhamhaeng University.

Discography

Studio albums

Filmography

Soap opera

Sitcom

Film

Series

YouTube

Magazines 
 CENTERPOINT vol. 1 no. 18 July 2008
 KAZZ vol. 3 no. 27 July 2008
 KAZZ vol. 4 no. 41 September 2009
 KAZZ MINI vol. 2 no. 13 September 2009
 ILIKE vol. 8 no. 170 December 2009

Business 
 Sugar Moustache
 Chalé

References 

Leo Saussay
Leo Saussay
Leo Saussay
Leo Saussay
1990 births
Living people